Jomabazar may refer to:
 Jomabazar, Chabahar
 Jomabazar, Polan, Chabahar County